Diego Alberto Pacheco Hernández (born June 17, 1995) is a professional Mexican footballer who currently plays for C.F. Monterrey Premier.

References

External links
 

1995 births
Living people
Mexican footballers
Association football midfielders
C.F. Monterrey players
Liga MX players
Place of birth missing (living people)
21st-century Mexican people